Welcome to the St. James' Club is the fourth album by the American jazz group the Rippingtons, released in 1990. It reached No. 1 on Billboard's Jazz chart. The group supported the album with a North American tour. The album was produced by Russ Freeman, who chose to give the songs a more rhythmic direction.

Critical reception

The Philadelphia Inquirer deemed the album "generally complex, heavily synthesized music—some of it heavily orchestrated." The Chicago Tribune concluded that "what pop is to rock, the Rippingtons is to jazz—upbeat, modern and able to sell a lot of albums."

Track listing
(All tracks composed by Russ Freeman).
"Welcome to the St. James' Club" - 4:41
"Wednesday's Child" - 4:53
"I Watched Her Walk Away" - 5:24
"Kenya" - 5:23
"Affair in San Miguel" - 5:04
"Tropic of Capricorn" - 4:59
"Who's Holding Her Now?" - 3:53
"Soul Mates" - 4:57
"Passion Fruit" - 4:34
"Victoria's Secret" - 3:25

Personnel 

The Rippingtons
 Russ Freeman – keyboards (1-10), keyboard programming (1-10), acoustic guitar (1, 5, 6, 7), electric guitar (1-6, 8, 9, 10), guitar synthesizer (1-4, 6, 8, 10), bass (1-10), drums (1-5, 8, 10), classical guitar (3), percussion (4, 8)
 Steve Bailey – additional fretless bass (2, 4, 5, 9, 10)
 Tony Morales – cymbal (1-5, 8), hi-hat (1-5, 8), additional cymbal (7)
 Steve Reid – percussion (1-10), vocals (6)
 Jeff Kashiwa – saxophone (1, 6), EWI controller (1)

Guest Musicians and Vocalists
 Mike Lang – acoustic piano (6)
 Joe Sample – acoustic piano (9)
 Vinnie Colaiuta – drums (6, 7, 9)
 Brant Biles – additional shaker (1)
 Kirk Whalum – saxophone (2, 8)
 Judd Miller – EWI controller (2, 4, 10)
 Brandon Fields – saxophone (3, 5, 7, 9), soprano saxophone (10)
 Carl Anderson – vocals (1, 4)
 Lynne Fiddmont – vocals (1)
 Patti Austin – vocals (3, 8)
 Dee Dee Bellson – vocals (4)
 Kevin Guillaume – vocals (4)

Production 
 Russ Freeman – producer, arrangements, engineer, mixing 
 Dave Grusin – executive producer 
 Larry Rosen – executive producer 
 Anthony Jeffries – additional engineer
 Robert Margouleff – additional engineer, mixing
 David Nesse – additional engineer
 Steve Reid – additional engineer
 Mike Scotella – additional engineer
 Brant Biles – mix associate
 Carl Griffin – additional mixing (2, 4, 8)
 Bernie Grundman – editing, mastering 
 Bruce Volk – technical support 
 Suzanne Sherman – production coordinator 
 Bill Mayer – front cover artwork 
 Andy Baltimore – creative director 
 David Gibb – graphic design
 Jacki McCarthy – graphic design
 Andy Ruggirello – graphic design
 Dan Serrano – graphic design 
 Jeff Sedlik – photography 
 Mixed at Aire L. A. Studios (Glendale, California).
 Edited and Mastered at Bernie Grundman Mastering (Hollywood, California).

Charts

References

External links
The Rippingtons - Welcome to the St. James Club at Discogs
The Rippingtons Official Website

The Rippingtons albums
1990 albums
GRP Records albums